"Las Mañanitas"  is a traditional Mexican birthday song written by Mexican composer Alfonso Esparza Oteo. It is widely popular in Mexico, usually early in the morning to awaken the birthday person, also before eating cake, and especially as part of the custom of serenading women. In Mexico, Las Mañanitas is sung to men and women of all ages. Perhaps the most famous rendition of "Las Mañanitas" is that sung by Pedro Infante to "Chachita" in the movie Nosotros los pobres. It is also sung in English in The Leopard Man (1943).

Lyrics 

Often if being sung instead of played from a recording, "mi bien" ("my dear") is replaced with the name of the person being celebrated, e.g. Despierta, Jacob, despierta, mira que ya amaneció. Single syllable names are stretched through the two original notes, and longer or compound names are often elided to fit the music, such as Guadalupe or "José Alberto", which in Spanish would be sung "Josealberto", creating a diphthong in the second syllable.

In some regions, the second line of the first stanza is sometimes sung "... a las muchachas bonitas se las cantamos aquí", or, in English, "... to the pretty girls we sing them here" instead of hoy por ser día de tu Santo te las cantamos aqui. Years ago, it was common to give a child the name of the patron saint that corresponded to the day the child was born. (see Calendar of saints).. Also in some regions, hoy por ser tu cumpleaños is sung instead of hoy por ser día de tu santo.

The song is usually set in the key of A major at a  time signature at the first 2 stanzas with tempos between 90-100 beats per minute, then shifts to a  time signature for the rest of the song.

Mexico
Every year, on the eve of 12 December, mañanitas are sung to honor Our Lady of Guadalupe by Mexico's most famous and popular artists in the Basilica of Our Lady of Guadalupe.

United States

New Mexico
In the US State of New Mexico, Las Mañanitas is sometimes sung as an honorary song during birthday celebrations, for both men and women. One such example was during a live performance for Al Hurricane's 75th birthday. During the concert setlist, it was recorded by Al Hurricane Jr. and Christian Sanchez as a rendition alongside the English-language Happy Birthday to You. The concert was later released as an album mastered by Lorenzo Antonio.

Puerto Rico

Las Mañanitas are also an annual event held in Ponce, Puerto Rico, dedicated to Our Lady of Guadalupe. It consists of a pre-dawn festival parade, followed by a Catholic Mass, and a popular breakfast. The celebration started in 1964,<ref name=Latente>Latente la Tradicion: Multitud Madruga para Venerar en Ponce la Virgen de Guadalupe. Coral Negron Almodovar. La Perla del Sur. Year 35, Issue 1724. (14 to 20 December 2016) Ponce, Puerto Rico. p.4.</ref> but the circumstances of its origin are uncertain. Some say it was started by immigrant Mexican engineers while others state it was started by Spaniards from Extremadura, Spain. The early morning, pre-dawn celebration is attended by over 10,000 people, including mayors and other prominent figures. The city of Ponce offers a free breakfast to everyone present at the historic Ponce City Hall after the religious Mass concludes.

Further reading

Olga Martha Peña Doria, "La dramaturgia femenina y el corrido mexicano teatralizado." Sincronía'', Fall 2002, p. 2.

See also
 List of birthday songs

References 

PEER INTERNATIONAL CORPORATION

Sociedad de Autores y Compositores de México.

External links 

 Lyrics Translate: Las Mananitas

Mexican folk songs
Songs about birthdays
Songs about birthday parties
Mariachi
Spanish children's songs
Spanish-language songs
Traditional children's songs